Elections to the municipal council of Ababuj, Teruel province, Spain. The council only has one seat.

May 2003

June 1999

May 1995

May 1991

June 1987

Municipal elections in Spain